The Canta-Concerto is a concerto for mezzo-soprano and orchestra by the American composer Marc Neikrug.  The work was commissioned by the New York Philharmonic and was completed in May 2014.  It was first performed by the mezzo-soprano Sasha Cooke and the New York Philharmonic under the direction of Alan Gilbert at David Geffen Hall on October 1, 2015.  The piece is dedicated to Alan Gilbert.

Composition

Background
Neikrug conceived the Canta-Concerto as concerto for voice—a genre with few examples in the classical repertoire.  In the score program notes, the composer wrote, "Instrumental students are always told by their teachers that the voice is the most natural and beautiful instrument and should be imitated. But it struck me that with the exception of a concerto by Glière, there are no concertos for voice."  He continued, "Since vocalists are very tied to 'the word,' they are always choosing a middle ground between diction and pure sound production. I wanted to write a piece where the sound production dominates and the range of emotional context was that of a concerto for an instrument."  The composition has a duration of approximately 25 minutes and is cast in four numbered movements, which Neikrug described as "a dramatic first movement, a scherzo-like interlude, a slow movement, and a finale that owes more than a bit to jazz."

Instrumentation
The work is scored for a solo mezzo-soprano and an orchestra comprising three flutes (one doubling alto flute), three oboes (one doubling cor anglais, three clarinets (one doubling bass clarinet), two bassoons, four horns, two trumpets, two trombones, tuba, timpani, three percussionists, harp, celesta, and strings.

Reception
Reviewing the world premiere, Anthony Tommasini of The New York Times called the Canta-Concerto a "skillfully written piece" and wrote, "  He continued:
Tommasini nevertheless added, "Canta-Concerto inventively rattles your expectations of what a work for voice and orchestra can be. The music itself, however, on first hearing, lacked a final measure of inspiration and originality; it was a little dourly Bergian."

Arlo McKinnon of Opera News was more critical of the work, however, observing:

References

Compositions by Marc Neikrug
2014 compositions
Concertos
Music commissioned by the New York Philharmonic